APP-FUBINACA is an indazole-based synthetic cannabinoid that has been sold online as a designer drug. Pharmacological testing showed APP-FUBINACA to have only moderate affinity for the CB1 receptor, with a Ki of 708 nM, while its EC50 was not tested. It contains a phenylalanine amino acid residue in its structure.

Legality
Sweden's public health agency suggested to classify APP-FUBINACA as hazardous substance on March 24, 2015.

See also

 5F-AB-PINACA
 5F-ADB
 5F-AMB
 5F-APINACA
 AB-FUBINACA
 AB-CHFUPYCA
 AB-CHMINACA
 AB-PINACA
 ADB-CHMINACA
 ADB-FUBINACA
 ADB-PINACA
 ADBICA
 APICA
 APINACA
 APP-BINACA
 BMS-F
 MDMB-CHMICA
 MDMB-FUBINACA
 PX-1
 PX-2
 PX-3

References

Cannabinoids
Designer drugs
Indazolecarboxamides
Fluoroarenes